Cachan is a commune in the southern suburbs of Paris, France.

The prestigious École normale supérieure Paris-Saclay and École Spéciale des Travaux Publics are located there.

Name
During the Middle Ages, Cachan was referred to in Medieval Latin texts as Caticantum, later corrupted into Cachentum, Cachant, and then Cachan. Some understand Caticantum as meaning "singing of the cat", "mewing of the cat", but this is not certain. Some others see a connection with the verb "to hunt" (captiare in Vulgar Latin, chacier in Old French).

History
Cachan was originally a hamlet within the commune of Arcueil, later renamed Arcueil-Cachan. The commune of Cachan was created on 26 December 1922 when it seceded from the commune of Arcueil-Cachan, which was renamed back to Arcueil.

Population

Neighboring communes
 Arcueil - north
 Villejuif - east
 L'Haÿ-les-Roses - southeast
 Bourg-la-Reine - southwest
 Bagneux - west

Transport
Cachan is served by two stations on Paris RER line B: Arcueil–Cachan and Bagneux.

Education
Primary schools:
 Six public preschools (écoles maternelles): Belle Image, Carnot, Coteau, Paul-Doumer, La Plaine, and Pont-Royal
 Five public elementaries: Belle Image, Carnot, Coteau, Paul-Doumer, La Plaine
 One private preschool and elementary: École Saint-Joseph

Secondary schools:
 Public junior high schools: Collège Victor-Hugo and Collège Paul-Bert
 Private junior high: Collège Saint-Joseph
 Public high schools/sixth-form colleges: Lycée Gustave Eiffel, Lycée Maximilien Sorre, Le foyer de Cachan

See also
Communes of the Val-de-Marne department
 École normale supérieure Paris-Saclay
François Bazin (sculptor)Sculptor Cachan War Memorial

References

External links

 Cachan town council website
 News around Cachan
 Cachan entry from the Quid Encyclopedia

Communes of Val-de-Marne